Sports on Fire is a Canadian television documentary series, which aired on HBO Canada in 2015. Created and produced by Pete McCormack, the six-episode series explored the historical, political and social context of several important moments in sports history.

The series garnered a Canadian Screen Award nomination for Best Sports Program or Series at the 4th Canadian Screen Awards in 2016.

Episodes

References

External links 
 

2015 Canadian television series debuts
2015 Canadian television series endings
2010s Canadian documentary television series
2010s Canadian sports television series
Crave original programming